Stachys sprucei is a species of flowering plant in the family Lamiaceae. It is found only in Ecuador. Its natural habitat is subtropical or tropical dry shrubland.

References

sprucei
Flora of Ecuador
Vulnerable plants
Taxonomy articles created by Polbot
Plants described in 1898